This article lists fellows of the Royal Society who were elected in 2019.

Fellows

 Salim Abdool Karim
 Charles Bangham
 Gurdyal Besra
 Manjul Bhargava
 Caucher Birkar
 Benjamin Blencowe
 James Briscoe
 Peter A. Butler
 Lucy Carpenter
 Sarah Darby
 George Davey Smith
 Martin Embley
 Bernard Fanaroff
 Jonathan Flint
 Véronique Gouverneur
 Christopher Hacon
 Mark Handley
 Richard Harland
 Peter H. Haynes
 Martin Head-Gordon
 Matthew Hurles
 Richard Jozsa
 Gagandeep Kang
 Steve A. Kay
 John-Michael Kendall
 Roy Kerr
 Jonathan C. Knight
 Marta Kwiatkowska
 Mark Mayer
 Gareth H. McKinley
 David G. Nicholls
 Christine Orengo
 Anne Osbourn
 Anant Parekh
 Julian Peto
 Caetano Reis e Sousa
 John Rodenburg
 Matthew Rushworth
 Leonid Sazanov
 Gregory D. Scholes
 Barbara Sherwood Lollar
 Molly Shoichet
 Liz Sockett
 Paraskevas Sphicas
 Jack W. Szostak
 Andrew D. Taylor
 Robert Tibshirani
 Ian Tomlinson
 Douglass Turnbull
 Akshay Venkatesh
 Kumar Wickramasinghe

Foreign members

 Barry Barish
 Hans Clevers
 Sandra Díaz
 Jack Dongarra
 Elaine Fuchs
 Inez Fung
 David Milstein
 Akkihebbal Ravishankara
 James Rothman
 Brian Staskawicz

Honorary fellows

 Yusuf Hamied

References

2019
2019 in the United Kingdom
2019 in science